Monica Elfvin later Nökleby  (born 22 November 1938) is a Swedish gymnast. She competed in six events at the 1960 Summer Olympics.

References

1938 births
Living people
Swedish female artistic gymnasts
Olympic gymnasts of Sweden
Gymnasts at the 1960 Summer Olympics
Sportspeople from Gothenburg
20th-century Swedish women